Joan Carles Toscano Beltrán (born 14 August 1984) is an Andorran international footballer who plays for UE Sant Julià, as a striker.

Career
He has played for CE Principat, FC Santa Coloma, CF Gimnástico Alcázar, CD Binéfar, FC Andorra, FC Ordino and Inter Club d'Escaldes.

In January 2019, Toscano joined UE Sant Julià.

He made his international debut for Andorra in 2006.

References

1984 births
Living people
Andorran footballers
Andorra international footballers
CE Principat players
FC Santa Coloma players
CF Gimnástico Alcázar players
CD Binéfar players
FC Andorra players
FC Ordino players
Inter Club d'Escaldes players
UE Sant Julià players
Association football forwards
Andorran expatriate footballers
Andorran expatriate sportspeople in Spain
Expatriate footballers in Spain